Massachusetts wine refers to wine made from grapes grown in the U.S. state of Massachusetts. Most of the wine grape vineyards and wineries in Massachusetts are located in the southern half of the state, within the boundaries of the Southeastern New England AVA.  Although the coastal conditions moderate the cold climate, many wineries rely upon cold-hardy French hybrid varietals like Seyval, Vidal, and Marechal Foch.   There are over 55 wineries in Massachusetts, and one designated American Viticultural Area, the Martha's Vineyard AVA, located entirely within the boundaries of the state.

See also

 American wine
 List of wineries in New England

References

 
Wine regions of the United States by state